The Harbin Z-19 is a Chinese light reconnaissance/attack helicopter developed by Harbin Aircraft Manufacturing Corporation (HAMC) for the People's Liberation Army Air Force and the Ground Force Army Aviation.  It is a specialized combat variant of the Harbin Z-9, which is a licence-built version of the Eurocopter Dauphin.

Design and development
The Z-19 is an upgraded tandem seat version of the Harbin Z-9W (similar to the development of the Bell AH-1 Cobra from the UH-1), using mechanical components derived from the Eurocopter AS365 Dauphin series, as the Z-9 series are license-built versions of the Dauphin helicopters.

The Z-19 features a fenestron tail, reducing the noise level and therefore allowing it to achieve some level of acoustic stealthiness. The exhausts have also been designed to reduce the infrared signature. The helicopter is equipped with a millimeter-wave fire-control radar on top of its four-blade rotor. Unlike most other attack helicopters, it lacks a nose-mounted machine gun or autocannon.

The Z-19 also features armor plating, crash-resistant seats, and a turret with FLIR, TV, and laser rangefinder. It is also equipped with advanced helmet mounted sight (HMS), which looks different from that of the CAIC Z-10.

The general designer of the Z-19 was Wu Ximing (吴希明) of the 602nd Research Institute, one of the Chinese top scientists involved in the 863 Program, after graduating from Nanjing University of Aeronautics and Astronautics in 1984. Wu had earlier participated in the designs of the armed version of the transport helicopters Z-8A, Z-11 and Z-9. He also participated in the development and flight testing of another Chinese attack helicopter, the CAIC Z-10. At the 9th Zhuhai Airshow held in November 2012, Aviation Industry Corporation of China formally announced the official names of the Z-10 and Z-19 at a televised news release conference, with both attack helicopters named after fictional characters in the Water Margin, one of the Four Great Classical Novels of Chinese literature. Z-10 is named as  Fierce Thunderbolt (Pili Huo, 霹雳火), the nickname of Qin Ming, while Z-19 is named as Black Whirlwind (Hei Xuanfeng, 黑旋风), the nickname of Li Kui.

Variants
 Z-19 Original version in the PLAGF service.
 Z-19E Export version of the Z-19. The first flight occurred on 18 May 2017. A number of countries expressed interest in acquisition.

Operators

 People's Liberation Army Ground Force

Specifications (Z-19)

See also

References

External links

 AirForceWorld.com Z-19 Attacker Helicopter

2010s Chinese attack aircraft
Harbin aircraft
Military helicopters
2010s Chinese helicopters
Fantail helicopters
Aircraft first flown in 2011
Twin-turbine helicopters